Elizabeth Frances Amherst Hale (1774 – 18 June 1826) was a Canadian artist living in Lower Canada (later Quebec).
The daughter of William Amherst and Elizabeth Patterson, she was born Elizabeth Frances Amherst in England and grew up there. Hale moved to Canada in 1799 when her husband, John Hale, an officer in the British Army, was posted to Quebec City. She is known for her drawings and paintings of landscapes, particularly a watercolour of the new city of York (now Toronto) in 1804. During the War of 1812 she took her children to England to avoid the conflict, returning after the war ended. After her husband purchased the seigneury of Sainte-Anne-de-la-Pérade, she filled a sketchbook with drawings of the buildings on the property and the surrounding area.

Colin Coates credited her with bringing an "English noble aesthetic" to Quebec. Hale's work is found in the collections of the National Gallery of Canada, the Art Gallery of Ontario, Library and Archives Canada, the Eastern Townships Resource Centre, the Canadian Women Artists History Initiative Documentation Centre and the Musée du Québec.

Her son Edward was a member of the province's legislative council. Her son Jeffery was a prominent philanthropist.

She died at Quebec City in 1826.

Her correspondence with her brother William Amherst, 1st Earl Amherst was published as The Rising Country: the Hale-Amherst Correspondence, 1799-1825. Her work is included in the collection of the Musée national des beaux-arts du Québec.

References

1774 births
1826 deaths
18th-century Canadian women artists
19th-century Canadian women artists
Canadian watercolourists
Women watercolorists
Canadian women painters
English emigrants to pre-Confederation Quebec
Anglophone Quebec people